Feasta is an Irish-language magazine that was established in 1948. Its purpose is the furtherance of the aims of Conradh na Gaeilge (Gaelic League), an objective reflecting the cultural nationalism of the language movement, and the promotion of new writing. Feasta describes itself as a review of Irish thought, literature, politics, and science (Reiviú den Smaointeachas Éireannach - litríocht, polaitíocht, eolaíocht). It was formerly supported by Foras na Gaeilge, but this support was withdrawn because of a review of funding priorities. At present the magazine relies on its own resources.

History 
Feasta'''s foundation in the 1940s reflected the progress made in Irish-language journalism and writing generally since the Gaelic Revival. Together with other journals such as An tUltach and Comhar, it was an agent in adapting the language to the requirements of the modern world, and helped determine the course of Irish-language writing.   
 
The magazine has had many editors, the longest serving being the poet and educationalist Pádraig Mac Fhearghusa. Previous editors also included Seosamh Ó Duibhginn (later Irish-language editor of The Irish Press), Eoghan Ó Tuairisc, Séamas Ruiséil, Aogán Ó Muircheartaigh and Íte Ní Chionnaith, who was also the first woman elected as president of Conradh na Gaeilge. The current editor is Cormac Ó hAodha.

Despite its links with Conradh na Gaeilge, Feasta functions as an independent magazine and notes that the views expressed therein are not necessarily those of the Conradh itself.

 Scope Feasta publishes literary criticism, reviews, and social and political commentary, with some regular columnists. Social and cultural events relating to the Irish language are also covered. Poetry is published regularly and past contributors have included Máirtín Ó Direáin, Máire Mhac an tSaoi, Seán Ó Ríordáin, and Nuala Ní Dhomhnaill. The magazine also publishes short fiction, with particular emphasis on new writing. Despite its general emphasis on the linguistic and cultural situation in Ireland, Feasta publishes Irish-language material from overseas when available. The magazine also carries advertising by Irish-language publishers.

 See also 
Modern literature in Irish

 References 

 Further reading 
Caerwyn Williams, J.E. and Ní Mhuiríosa, Máirín (1979), Traidisiún Liteartha na nGael''. An Clóchomhar Tta, Baile Átha Cliath.

External links 
 

Magazines published in Ireland
Magazines established in 1948
Cultural magazines
Conradh na Gaeilge